This article lists the winners of the monthly awards in the Scottish Football League.

2000–01 season

2001–02 season

Team of the Month
January - Berwick Rangers

2002–03 season

2003–04 season

2004–05 season

2005–06 season

2006–07 season

2007–08 season

2008–09 season

2009–10 season

2010–11 season

 Alloa Athletic chairman Mike Mulraney also awarded a Phenomenal Achievement Award for December 2010.

2011–12 season

Goal of the Month winners
July / August 2011:  Annan Athletic striker David Cox
October 2011:  Stenhousemuir striker Andy Rodgers.
November 2011:  Clyde defender Gavin Brown.
December 2011:  Livingston striker Keaghan Jacobs.
January 2012:  Dundee striker Steven Milne.
February 2012:  Falkirk midfielder Jay Fulton
March 2012:  Dumbarton striker Bryan Prunty.
April / May 2012:  Ayr United striker Keigan Parker

2012–13 season

Goal of the Month winners
July / August 2012:  Livingston midfielder Dylan Easton
September 2012:  East Fife midfielder Jamie Pollock
October 2012:  Dunfermline Athletic striker Ryan Wallace
November 2012:  Queen's Park defender Andy Robertson
January 2013:  Queen of the South striker Nicky Clark
February 2013:  Dumbarton striker Bryan Prunty

See also
 Scottish Football League Yearly Awards
 Scottish Premier League monthly awards
 Scottish Professional Football League monthly awards

References

Awards
Scottish football trophies and awards
Awards established in 2004
Awards disestablished in 2013